Verkhny Landekh is an urban locality (urban-type settlement) and the administrative center of Verkhnelandekhovsky District of Ivanovo Oblast, Russia. Population:

References

Notes

Sources

Urban-type settlements in Ivanovo Oblast
Gorokhovetsky Uyezd